Amarillo by Morning may refer to:

 "Amarillo by Morning" (song), a song by Paul Fraser & Terry Stafford, covered by numerous artists, including George Strait and Asleep at the Wheel
 Amarillo by Morning (film), a documentary film by Spike Jonze